Chief Monze is the spiritual leader of the Tonga people of southern Zambia. The chief's palace is south of the town of Monze named after him, near a place called Gonde, where a ceremony called Lwiindi takes place. This annual festival is a thanksgiving ceremony which attracts a lot of people from around Zambia. The current Chief Monze, Chief Magunza Monze who assumed this position in 1990, is descendant of a line dating back to the 1700s.

References
'Chief Monze' on Monze Education Fund website accessed 26 February 2017.

Traditional rulers in Zambia
Living people
Year of birth missing (living people)